Matteo Moschetti (born 14 August 1996) is an Italian cyclist, who currently rides for UCI ProTeam .

Career

Early years
As a junior, Moschetti raced on the road and track, winning the junior national team pursuit championships in 2014 with teammates Giovanni Pedretti, Imerio Cima and Giacomo Garavaglia. In 2017, Moschetti won his second national championship when he won the under-23 race at the Italian National Road Race Championships.

Polartec–Kometa (2018)
Moschetti joined UCI Continental team  for the 2018 season, and brought the team their first victory when he won stage 1 of the Tour of Antalya. His success continued, winning stage 4 of the same race, the International Rhodes Grand Prix a week later, and stage 2 of the International Tour of Rhodes. During the Tour de Normandie, a French stage race, Moschetti won stages 4 and 7, ultimately finishing second overall in the points classification. After his success in the Tour de Normandie, Moschetti signed a 2-year contract with UCI WorldTeam , for the 2019 and 2020 season.

Trek–Segafredo (2019–2022)
In May 2019, he was named in the startlist for the 2019 Giro d'Italia, his first Grand Tour, but failed to finish. In October 2020, he was named in the startlist for the 2020 Vuelta a España.

Major results

2014
 1st  Team pursuit, National Track Championships
2017
 1st  Road race, National Under-23 Road Championships
2018
 1st ZLM Tour
 1st International Rhodes Grand Prix
 Tour of Antalya
1st  Points classification
1st Stages 1 & 4
 Tour de Normandie
1st Stages 4 & 7
 1st Stage 2 Vuelta a Burgos
 1st Stage 2 Tour de Hongrie
 1st Stage 2 Tour of Rhodes
2019
 4th Grand Prix de Denain
 10th Scheldeprijs
2020
 1st Trofeo Campos, Porreres, Felanitx, Ses Salines 
 1st Trofeo de Playa de Palma-Palma 
2021
 1st Per sempre Alfredo 
 4th Kampioenschap van Vlaanderen
2022
 1st Stage 4 Volta a la Comunitat Valenciana
 1st Stage 2 International Tour of Hellas
 9th Trofeo Playa de Palma
2023
 1st Clásica de Almería
 5th Milano–Torino

Grand Tour general classification results timeline

References

External links

1996 births
Living people
Italian male cyclists
Cyclists from Milan